Ietsism ( – "somethingism") is an unspecified belief in an undetermined transcendent reality. It is a Dutch term for a range of beliefs held by people who, on the one hand, inwardly suspect – or indeed believe – that "there must be something undefined beyond the mundane and that which can be known or can be proven", but on the other hand do not accept or subscribe to the established belief system, dogma or view of the nature of a deity offered by any particular religion. Some related terms in English are agnostic theism (though many ietsists do not believe in anything that could be called "god", and therefore are agnostic atheists), eclecticism, deism and spiritual but not religious. 

Ietsists might call themselves Christian or followers of another religion based on cultural identification with that religion, without believing in the dogmas of that particular religion.

Etymology 
The name derives from the Dutch equivalent of the question: "Do you believe in (the conventional 'Christian') God?", a typical ietsist answer being "No, but there must be something", "something" being iets in Dutch.

The atheist political columnist and molecular biologist Ronald Plasterk (who later served as the Dutch Minister of Education, Culture and Science and Minister of the Interior and Kingdom Relations) published a piece in 1997 in the magazine Intermediair in which he used the word. The term became widely known in the Netherlands after Plasterk used it in a feature for the television programme Buitenhof. In October 2005, the word ietsisme was included in the 14th edition of the Dutch Language Dictionary Dikke Van Dale.

Around the year 2012, the word began to circulate among English speakers as a loanword.  More recently, the word ietsers ("somethingers") has emerged in the Netherlands to describe people of this viewpoint, but this has not yet been widely borrowed into English.

The term ietsism is becoming more widely used in Europe, as opposed to the phrase 'spiritual but not religious' which prevails in North America.

Beliefs 
Ietsism may roughly be described as a belief in an end-in-itself or similar concept, without further assumption as to exactly what object or objects have such a property, like intrinsic aliquidism without further specification. Other aliquidistic lifestances include the acceptance of "there is something – that is, some meaning of life, something that is an end-in-itself or something more to existence – and it is...", assuming various objects or truths, while ietsism, on the other hand simply accepts "there is something", without further specification, detailing or assumption.

In contrast to traditional agnostics who often hold a skeptical view about gods or other metaphysical entities (i.e. “We can't or don't know for sure that there is a God"), “ietsists” take a viewpoint along the lines of, “And yet it feels like there is something out there..." It is a form of religious liberalism or non-denominationalism. Ietsism may also be described as the minimal counterpart of nihilism, since it accepts that there is something, but yet, assumes as little further as possible without any more substantial evidence. 

Within ietsism beliefs are very diverse but all have in common that they are not classifiable under a traditional religion. Often concepts from different religions, folk beliefs, superstitions or ideologies are combined, but the ietsist does not feel that they belong to or believe in the dogmas of any particular religion. There is usually not a personal god who actively intervenes in the believer's life and an ietsist can be an atheist at the same time.  

An opinion poll conducted by the Dutch daily newspaper Trouw in October 2004 indicated that some 40% of its readership felt broadly this way, and other Northern European countries would probably get similar rates. From a December 2014 survey by the VU University Amsterdam, it was concluded that the Dutch population has 27% ietsists, 31% agnostics, 25% atheists and 17% theists.

As ietsists cannot be neatly classified as religious or nonreligious, ietsism is somewhat notorious for blighting statistics on religious demographics. Hence labeling ietsists as either religious or nonreligious will tilt the demographic balance for those countries to either predominantly religious or predominantly nonreligious.

See also
 Deism
 Higher Power 
 Ignosticism
 Irreligion
 List of English words of Dutch origin
 Moralistic therapeutic deism
 Religion in the Netherlands
 Spiritual but not religious
 Unknown God

References

Agnosticism
Theism
Deism